Polybotrya is a genus of ferns in the family Dryopteridaceae, subfamily Polybotryoideae, in the Pteridophyte Phylogeny Group classification of 2016 (PPG I).

Species
, the Checklist of Ferns and Lycophytes of the World accepted the following species:

Polybotrya aequatoriana R.C.Moran
Polybotrya alata R.C.Moran
Polybotrya alfredii Brade
Polybotrya altescandens C.Chr.
Polybotrya andina C.Chr.
Polybotrya appressa R.C.Moran
Polybotrya attenuata R.C.Moran
Polybotrya aureisquama A.Rojas
Polybotrya bipinnata A.Rojas
Polybotrya botryoides (Baker) C.Chr.
Polybotrya canaliculata Klotzsch
Polybotrya caudata Kunze
Polybotrya crassirhizoma Lellinger
Polybotrya cylindrica Kaulf.
Polybotrya espiritosantensis Brade
Polybotrya fractiserialis (Baker) J.Sm.
Polybotrya glandulosa Mett. ex Kuhn
Polybotrya gomezii R.C.Moran
Polybotrya goyazensis Brade
Polybotrya gracilis Brade
Polybotrya hickeyi R.C.Moran
Polybotrya insularis A.Rojas
Polybotrya latisquamosa R.C.Moran
Polybotrya lechleriana Mett.
Polybotrya lourteigiana Lellinger
Polybotrya matosii Canestraro & Labiak
Polybotrya osmundacea Humb. & Bonpl. ex Willd.
Polybotrya pilosa Brade
Polybotrya pittieri Lellinger
Polybotrya polybotryoides (Baker) Christ
Polybotrya pubens Mart. ex Kunze
Polybotrya puberulenta R.C.Moran
Polybotrya semipinnata Fée
Polybotrya serratifolia (Fée) Klotzsch
Polybotrya sessilisora R.C.Moran
Polybotrya sorbifolia Mett. ex Kuhn
Polybotrya speciosa Schott
Polybotrya stolzei R.C.Moran
Polybotrya suberecta (Baker) C.Chr.

References

Dryopteridaceae
Fern genera
Taxonomy articles created by Polbot